Vauhini Studios was an Indian film production company and studio facility in Madras. It was founded by Moola Narayana Swamy and B. N. Reddy (Bommireddy Narasimha Reddy). In later years, Nagi Reddi, owner of Vijaya Productions, acquired Vauhini studios on lease. In 1961, Nagi Reddi purchased Vauhini Studios from Narayana Swamy's son Moola Venkata Rangaiah and merged it with his Vijaya Productions and named it as Vijaya Vauhini Studios.

History 
Rohini Pictures was formed by the partnership of H. M. Reddy along with B. N. Reddy and Moola Narayana Swamy. The latter two had differences with H. M. Reddy and split themselves from Rohini Pictures and established Vauhini Pictures. Narayana Swamy was the Chairman and B. N. Reddy was the Managing Director the company. K. V. Reddy, close friend of Narayana Swamy also joined Vauhini Pictures along with them and was also made a partner in the company. Films like Vande Mataram (1939), Sumangali (1940), Devatha (1941) were made on Vauhini Pictures banner in the direction of B. N. Reddy.

K. V. Reddy directed Bhakta Pothana (1943) for the company as his maiden directorial venture. After the huge success of the film, Narayana Swamy who had interests in other business ventures focused on film production. He made a proposal to the board to confine Vauhini Pictures to film distribution and start Vauhini Productions for film production. The proposal was approved, and Narayana Swamy invested 2 lakh out of the total capital of 2.5 lakh. Rest of the 50,000 was provided by the family of B. N. Reddy and K. V. Reddy. It was decided that B. N. Reddy and K. V. Reddy would alternately direct films for the production house.

When Vauhini Productions made Swargaseema (1945) as its first production under the direction of B. N. Reddy, K. V. Reddy worked as a production manager for the film. Later, K. V. Reddy directed Yogi Vemana (1947) under Vauhini Productions banner.

Around the same time, Vauhini Productions' films were getting delayed due to lack of studio facilities. And so, they decided to build a studio of their own. Narayana Swamy invested the capital required for building the studio while B. N. Reddy took up the responsibility of managing the construction work. Thus, Vauhini Studios came into being. The first film produced by Vauhini Studios was Gunasundari Katha (1949).

Narayana Swamy's properties and businesses were seized due to income tax problems. He was fined around 30 lakh. Vauhini studio was hence leased, to Vijaya Productions, to save it from income tax department's attachment. In 1961, Nagi Reddi, the Managing Director of Vijaya Productions, purchased Vauhini Studios for 10 lakh from Narayana Swamy's son Moola Venkata Rangaiah and merged it with his Vijaya Productions and named it as Vijaya Vauhini Studios.

Films Produced 

Vauhini Pictures 

 Vande Mataram (1939)
 Sumangali (1940)
 Devatha (1941).
 Bhakta Pothana (1943)

Vauhini Productions

 Swargaseema (1945)
 Yogi Vemana (1947)
 Vaddante Dabbu
 Gunasundari Katha (1949)
 Malliswari (1951)
 Pedda Manushulu (1954)

References

Bibliography 

 

Indian film studios
Tamil cinema
Telugu cinema
Buildings and structures in Chennai
Indian companies established in 1948